Dino Ferruzzi (born 31 August 1892, date of death unknown) was an Italian equestrian. He competed in two events at the 1936 Summer Olympics.

References

External links
 

1892 births
Year of death missing
Italian male equestrians
Olympic equestrians of Italy
Equestrians at the 1936 Summer Olympics
Sportspeople from the Province of Viterbo